The Swetha River is a river in India. It carries the drainages of Pachaimalai and Kolli Hills. It joins with Vasishta Nadi to form Vellar River and flows into the Bay of Bengal, emptying near Parangipettai.

References 

Rivers of Tamil Nadu
Rivers of India